The United List (AS) is a centrist and regionalist political alliance in Latvia established to contest the 2022 parliamentary election. The list consists of the Latvian Green Party, the Latvian Association of Regions, the Liepāja Party, as well as the "United List of Latvia" association led by Liepāja construction contractor Uldis Pīlēns.

The list was founded on 1 July 2022. Later, LRA and LZP leaders Edvards Smiltēns and Edgars Tavars became the co-chairmen of the board of the association, and Uldis Pīlēns was named as the prime minister candidate.

The interim name of the ticket, in the works since May 2022, was reported as the "United List of Latvia" or the "Latvia United List" – previously, "Power of Regions" (Reģionu spēks) was suggested). The NGO led by Pīlēns scheduled its founding event for 1 July and announced that it would be called Apvienotais Latvijas saraksts. Pīlēns was announced as the alliance's candidate for Prime Minister.

One of the catalysts in the origins of the alliance was the refusal of the Green and Liepāja parties to work with their former Union of Greens and Farmers partners as they promoted convicted oligarch Aivars Lembergs as their prime ministerial candidate.

Members

Election results

Legislative elections

References 

Conservative parties in Latvia
Green conservative parties
Political party alliances in Latvia
Political parties established in 2022